Sonia Tetlow is an American songwriter and musician.  She fronts the band Herman Put Down The Gun and plays banjo in the alterna-grass group Roxie Watson. Formerly the singer/ guitarist for Atlanta punk rock trio, STB (Sonia Tetlow Band), which released two critically acclaimed independent albums, "Spit" and "Swerve." Tetlow played bass guitar in the rock band Cowboy Mouth from 2004-2007.

Early life
Sonia grew up in New Orleans and graduated from St. Mary's Dominican High School and Tulane University where her sister was formerly a law professor, now President of Loyola University New Orleans.

Career
Since then, she's lived in Atlanta. A diverse and talented multi-instrumentalist, she has toured extensively both in support of her own music, solo and with a band, as well as playing bass for New Orleans rockers Cowboy Mouth (mid-2004 through May 12, 2007) and guitar and mandolin for New Orleans singer/songwriter Paul Sanchez. Tetlow has also had the pleasure of performing on The Ellen DeGeneres Show, Atlanta and Company with Holly Firfir, the Louisiana Jukebox, as well as other news and radio broadcasts.

She has opened for Patti Smith, Shawn Mullins, Speech and Headliner from Arrested Development, Indigo Girls, Peter Holsapple and numerous others. She's toured the east coast, performing at such venues as the Atlanta Civic Center, the Roxy Theater, CBGB's, Newby's, The Bitter End and Cafe Passim to name a few. Sonia also has showcased at the Atlantis Music Conference in Atlanta, GA and ROCKRGRL Music Conference in Seattle.

Besides being a prolific songwriter in her own right, Tetlow has collaborated on songs with Paul Sanchez (Cowboy Mouth, Paul Sanchez Rolling Road Show), John Thomas Griffith (Red Rockers, Cowboy Mouth), Fred LeBlanc (Cowboy Mouth, Dash Rip Rock) and David Torkanowsky (Astral Project, Irma Thomas), and was awarded four writing credits on Cowboy Mouth's 2006 release, "VooDoo Shoppe." Her lyrics have been called, "uncompromising yet undeniably intimate," (Michael Andrews, Athens Flagpole) and her music runs the gamut from, "rocking with a barely contained intensity," (Hal Horowitz, Atlanta Press) to, "mellow but soulfully intoxicating," (Jeff Clark, Stomp and Stammer).

In 2017, Sonia Tetlow released the critically successful record "Now" which was produced by Atlanta ambient musician B.E.N

Discography

Albums with Herman Put Down The Gun 
  Herman Put Down The Gun' ' (2008)

 Albums with Roxie Watson 
  True Stories (2010)
  Of Milestones And Moon Pie (2012)
  Songs from Hell's Hollow (2014)

 Albums with Cowboy Mouth 
 Voodoo Shoppe (2006)

Albums with STB
 Spit (2000)
 Swerve (2001)

Solo albums
 Reclaiming Beauty (1998)
 A Seed of Sand (2006)
 One Way Home (2012)
 Now (2017)

Compilation albums
 inRetro'' (2011)
 Terminal Pop (Shut Eye, 1998)

External links 
 Sonia Tetlow's site
 Herman Put Down The Guns's site
 Roxie Watson's site

Cowboy Mouth members
Living people
Year of birth missing (living people)
American women rock singers
Women punk rock singers
Musicians from New Orleans
American punk rock bass guitarists
American alternative rock musicians
Tulane University alumni
Musicians from Atlanta
American punk rock singers
Women bass guitarists
Songwriters from Louisiana
Songwriters from Georgia (U.S. state)
Singers from Louisiana
Guitarists from Georgia (U.S. state)
Guitarists from Louisiana
21st-century American women